Madiha or Mediha is a female given name meaning “praiseworthy.” The origin of the name is Arabic.

People with the name
 Madiha Rashid Al-Madfai (d. 2019), Jordanian radio broadcaster
 Madeeha Gauhar, Pakistani actress
 Madiha Kamel (d. 1997), Egyptian actress
 Madiha (singer), a Dutch singer and songwriter
 Madiha Yousri (born Ghanima Habib Khalil in 1919), an Egyptian actress
 Madiha Shah (born Rubina Butt in 1970), a Pakistani actress
 Madiha Iftikhar (b. 1985), a Pakistani actress and model

See also
 Madiha (disambiguation)

Arabic feminine given names
Bosnian feminine given names
Pakistani feminine given names

Madiha means praise ( a song of praise )